Indirect presidential elections were held in Poland on 19 July 1989. The elections were the first after the office of President of the Republic of Poland had been re-established after a period of Communist rule and were the last in which the President was elected by Parliament (joint houses of the Sejm and Senate). Despite adoption of the democratic system there was only one candidate.

After the Round Table Agreement, which resulted in a semi-free parliamentary election, marked by effective Solidarity victory and de facto loss of the Polish United Workers' Party, on July 4, 1989, Adam Michnik proposed a power-sharing deal between communist and the democratic opposition (Your President, our Prime Minister), according to which Chairman of the Council of State and Communist leader Wojciech Jaruzelski would become President and a solidarity representative Prime Minister (this position indeed went to Tadeusz Mazowiecki in August). After much debate within both camps this conception won.

Jaruzelski ran unopposed, but won by just a one-vote majority needed, as many Solidarity MPs, while supporting the agreement, felt just unable to cast their votes or, to not disturb the process, cast abstain or invalid votes.

Results

Presidential elections in Poland
President
Poland
Poland